Dominik Meffert and Philipp Oswald were the defending champions but decided not to participate.

Daniele Bracciali and Potito Starace won the title, defeating Pablo Carreño Busta and Enrique López-Pérez in the final, 6–3, 6–3.

Seeds

  Daniele Bracciali /  Potito Starace (champions)
  Frank Moser /  Alexander Satschko (semifinals)
  Riccardo Ghedin /  Claudio Grassi (semifinals)
  Facundo Bagnis /  Sergio Galdós (first round)

Draw

Draw

References
 Main Draw

Citta di Caltanissetta - Doubles
2014 Doubles